Patricia Ann Ramsey ( Paugh; December 29, 1956 – June 24, 2006) was an American beauty pageant winner who won the Miss West Virginia Pageant at age 20 in 1977. She was best known as the mother of JonBenét Ramsey, a six-year-old child beauty pageant queen who was found dead in her family's home in Boulder, Colorado, on December 26, 1996.

Background
Ramsey was born in Parkersburg, West Virginia, the daughter of Nedra Ellen Ann (née Rymer) and Donald Ray Paugh, an engineer and manager at Union Carbide. She graduated from Parkersburg High School in 1975. She attended West Virginia University, where she belonged to the Alpha Xi Delta sorority, and from which she graduated with a B.A. in journalism in 1978.

She won the Miss West Virginia beauty title in 1977. Her sister, Pamela Ellen Paugh, won the Miss West Virginia title at age 24 in 1980.

Patsy was 23 when she married businessman John Ramsey on November 5, 1980. He had three children from his first marriage to Lucinda Pasch from 1966 to 1978, which had ended in divorce. Patsy and John's son, Burke Ramsey, was born on January 27, 1987. She gave birth to their second child, daughter JonBenét, on August 6, 1990, in Atlanta. The family moved to Boulder, Colorado in 1991 for her husband's business. Starting from when her daughter was young, Patsy entered her in children's beauty contests, and she won some titles before the age of six.

JonBenét's homicide

Her daughter JonBenét disappeared on the morning after Christmas Day 1996. A lengthy ransom note claimed that she had been kidnapped, demanding $118,000 for her return; Patsy reported finding this note at the foot of the stairs. Seven hours after Patsy contacted authorities, JonBenét's body was found in an isolated area of the Ramseys' basement. She had been killed by strangulation and a blow to the head. After the homicide of JonBenét was discovered, Boulder law enforcement officials declared that Patsy and her husband were "under an umbrella of suspicion" because of their possible involvement in the crime. The couple spent the next 10 years defending themselves against the allegations by insisting that an intruder killed their daughter.

A grand jury voted in 1999 to indict the parents of six-year-old JonBenét Ramsey on charges of child abuse resulting in death, but Boulder District Attorney Alex Hunter did not sign the indictment. Multiple sources, including members of the grand jury, have confirmed to the Daily Camera that Hunter refused to sign the indictment because he did not think there was sufficient evidence to prove the case beyond a reasonable doubt.

At around the same time, Lou Smit, a homicide detective who had been brought in to solve the case, opined that the Ramseys had been unfairly targeted, and that an intruder was likely responsible for the murder and its staging.

On July 9, 2008—nearly 12 years after their daughter's death and two years after Patsy's death—the Boulder District Attorney cleared John Ramsey and his late wife of any wrongdoing in their daughter's death. The decision was based on new DNA evidence that was collected from JonBenét's clothing, which belonged to an unidentified male not part of the family. This particular type of DNA analysis did not exist at the time of the killing. Boulder County District Attorney Mary Lacy said new DNA tests point to an "unexplained third party" as possibly responsible for the killing. Modern "touch DNA" suggests that a male of Hispanic origin (per updates on DNA and DNA found under JonBenét's fingernails two weeks after the murder, which Hunter had access to) left traces on two separate clothing articles: the undergarment panties and leggings. The official exoneration was done against normal practice, and the Boulder police have still not cleared them. (Mark Beckner, retired Boulder Chief of Police, has claimed that Mary Lacy had always strongly believed that a mother could not possibly be responsible for the death of her daughter in that fashion (and so sought to exonerate Ramsey), and that the trace DNA found on JonBenét's underwear (believed by the Colorado Bureau of Investigation to be either sweat or saliva) was in such minute quantities (nanograms) that it could have come from the clothing's manufacturing process.)

In October 2016, new forensic analysis with more refined technique revealed that the original DNA deposits contain genetic markers from two persons other than the victim herself. They have never been identified through any government databases.

Defamation lawsuits
Several defamation lawsuits have proceeded through the courts since JonBenét's death. Lin Wood was the plaintiff's lead attorney for John and Patsy Ramsey and for their son, Burke, and has prosecuted defamation claims on their behalf against St. Martin's Press, Time, Inc., The Fox News Channel, American Media, Inc., Star, The Globe, Court TV and The New York Post.  John and Patsy Ramsey were also sued in two separate defamation lawsuits arising from the publication of their book, The Death Of Innocence, brought by two individuals named in the book as having been investigated by Boulder police as suspects in JonBenét's death. The Ramseys were defended in those lawsuits by Lin Wood and three other Atlanta attorneys, James C. Rawls, Eric P. Schroeder, and S. Derek Bauer, who obtained dismissal of both lawsuits. In an in-depth decision, U.S. District Court Judge Julie Carnes ruled that "abundant evidence" in the homicide case pointed to an intruder having committed the crime, while "virtually no evidence" implicated the Ramseys.

Illness and death
Patsy Ramsey was diagnosed with stage 4 ovarian cancer in 1993, aged 36. After treatment, she was in remission for nine years until a recurrence in 2002.

Patsy Ramsey died from ovarian cancer at age 49 on June 24, 2006. She died at her father's house with her husband by her side. Ramsey is buried at St. James Episcopal Cemetery in Marietta, Georgia, next to JonBenét.

In popular culture
Ramsey was portrayed by Alex Borstein, opposite Michael McDonald as her husband, in two MADtv sketches; by Marg Helgenberger in the 2000 miniseries Perfect Murder, Perfect Town; and by actress Judi Evans in the 2000 TV movie Getting Away with Murder: The JonBenét Ramsey Mystery. Melora Hardin voiced her in the Family Guy episode, "Brian Wallows and Peter's Swallows".

She was portrayed in the 2001 South Park episode, "Butters' Very Own Episode". The episode strongly implied that Patsy Ramsey and her husband were responsible for the death of JonBenét. In a 2011 interview, South Park creators Trey Parker and Matt Stone stated that they regretted how the Ramseys were portrayed in the episode.

References

External links

Evidence voluminous but tricky
 Patsy Ramsey, JonBenet's mother, dies
Police: Ramseys remain under 'umbrella of suspicion'

1956 births
2006 deaths
American Episcopalians
Beauty pageant contestants from West Virginia
Burials in Georgia (U.S. state)
Deaths from cancer in Georgia (U.S. state)
Deaths from ovarian cancer
Killing of JonBenét Ramsey
Miss America 1970s delegates
Parkersburg High School alumni
People from Atlanta
People from Boulder, Colorado
People from Gilbert, West Virginia
People from Parkersburg, West Virginia
West Virginia University alumni